Mary's Harbour Airport  is  south of Mary's Harbour, Newfoundland and Labrador, Canada.

Airlines and destinations

References

External links

Certified airports in Newfoundland and Labrador